Mohamed Amine Amami (born 6 February 1983) is a Tunisian football defender.

References

1983 births
Living people
Tunisian footballers
US Monastir (football) players
EGS Gafsa players
ES Beni-Khalled players
Stade Tunisien players
Olympique Béja players
Grombalia Sports players
AS Soliman players
Association football defenders
Tunisian Ligue Professionnelle 1 players